RAHS may refer to:

 Royal Australian Historical Society
 Royal Agricultural and Horticultural Society of South Australia

Schools 

 Raisbeck Aviation High School in Tukwila, Washington, United States
 Redwood Alternative High School in Castro Valley, California, United States
 Reedsburg Area High School in Reedsburg, Wisconsin, United States
 Rio Americano High School in Sacramento, California, United States
 Roald Amundsen High School in Chicago, Illinois, United States
 Robbinsdale Armstrong High School in Plymouth, Minnesota, United States
 Rochester Adams High School in Rochester Hills, Michigan, United States
 Rochester Area High School (Pennsylvania) in Rochester, Pennsylvania, United States
 Rosario Advent High School in Rosario, Batangas Philippines
 Roseville Area High School in Roseville, Minnesota, United States
 Roussin Academy High School in Montreal, Quebec, Canada

See also 

 
 
 
 Rah (disambiguation)